Joanna Noëlle Levesque (born December 20, 1990), known professionally as JoJo, is an American singer and actress. She began performing in singing competitions and local talent shows as a child. In 2003, record producer Vincent Herbert noticed her after she competed on the television show America's Most Talented Kids and asked her to audition for his record label Blackground Records. After signing with the label, JoJo released her eponymous debut studio album in 2004. It peaked at number four on the US Billboard 200 and was later certified platinum by the Recording Industry Association of America (RIAA), selling over four million copies worldwide to date.

With her debut single "Leave (Get Out)" peaking atop the US Billboard Mainstream Top 40 chart, JoJo became the youngest solo artist in history to top the chart at age 13. The song peaked at 12 on the Billboard Hot 100 and was certified gold by the RIAA along with its follow-up single "Baby It's You". Her second studio album The High Road (2006) spawned her first top-five Hot 100 hit "Too Little Too Late", peaking at number three, becoming her first single to be certified platinum by the RIAA. The album was later certified gold, selling over three million copies worldwide to date.

Record label disputes delayed JoJo from commercially releasing her third studio album; she released two mixtapes independently, Can't Take That Away from Me (2010) and Agápē (2012). After her contractual release, JoJo signed with Atlantic Records in 2014 and released her first commercial EP III (2015), followed by her third studio album Mad Love (2016), which became her third top-ten album in the US. She left Atlantic in 2017 and founded her record label Clover Music through a joint venture with Warner Records, where she re-recorded and re-released her debut and second albums as the label's first project in 2018. JoJo's fourth studio album Good to Know was released in May 2020, preceded by its first single, "Man". In October, she released her first Christmas album called December Baby. By 2007, JoJo had sold more than seven million records worldwide, including 2.1 million albums and four million digital downloads in the United States.

In addition to her music career, JoJo has also pursued an acting career. In 2006, she made her on-screen feature film debut in Aquamarine and R.V. alongside Robin Williams. She has also had guest appearances on the television shows The Bernie Mac Show (2002), American Dreams (2004), Romeo! (2006), Hawaii Five-0 (2011) and Lethal Weapon (2017). Other films JoJo has appeared in include the Lifetime Television film True Confessions of a Hollywood Starlet (2008) and G.B.F. (2013).

Early life
Joanna Noëlle Levesque was born on December 20, 1990, in Brattleboro, Vermont, but raised in Keene, New Hampshire, and Foxborough, Massachusetts. She is of French-Canadian, English, Scottish, Irish, and Polish descent. Her father, Joel Maurice Levesque (January 8, 1955–November 14, 2015), sang as a hobby, and her mother, Diana Levesque (née Blagden) sang in a Catholic church choir and was trained in musical theater. JoJo's parents divorced when she was four years old, and she was raised as an only child by her mother. The name JoJo was a childhood nickname.

As a child, JoJo listened as her mother practiced hymns. She started singing when she was two years old by imitating everything from nursery rhymes to R&B, jazz, and soul tunes. As a child, JoJo enjoyed attending Native American festivals and acted locally in professional theaters.

At age seven, JoJo appeared on the television show Kids Say the Darndest Things: On the Road in Boston with American comedian and actor Bill Cosby, and she sang a song from singer Cher. After auditioning in the television show Destination Stardom, JoJo sang Aretha Franklin's 1967 hit "Respect" and "Chain of Fools". Soon after, The Oprah Winfrey Show contacted her, inviting her to perform. At age eleven, she performed on Maury during a "kids-with-talent" episode in 2002.

Career

1998–2005: Beginning and JoJo

At age six, JoJo was offered a record deal, but her mother turned it down because she believed JoJo was too young for a music career. After appearing on various talk shows, the McDonald's Gospelfest, performing Whitney Houston's "I Believe in You and Me" and competing on the television show, America's Most Talented Kids (losing to Diana DeGarmo), record producer Vincent Herbert contacted her and asked her to audition for Blackground Records. During her audition for Barry Hankerson, Hankerson told her that the spirit of his niece, the late singer Aaliyah, had brought her to him. She was signed to the label, and had recording sessions with producers The Underdogs and Soulshock & Karlin. JoJo's live demo, Joanna Levesque, recorded in 2001, features covers of soul and R&B songs, including Mack Rice's 1965 "Mustang Sally", Etta James's 1989 "It Ain't Always What You Do (It's Who You Let See You Do It)", Aretha Franklin's 1968 "Chain of Fools" and 1969 "The House That Jack Built", The Moonglows' 1956 "See Saw", Stevie Wonder's 1972 "Superstition", and The Temptations' 1975 "Shakey Ground".

In 2003, at age 12, JoJo signed with Blackground Records and Da Family and began working with producers for her first album. JoJo's gold-certified debut single "Leave (Get Out)" was released in 2004. Before the album's release, JoJo embarked on her first ever tour, the Cingular Buddy Bash with pop rock singer Fefe Dobson, hip hop duo Young Gunz, alternative metal band Zebrahead, and teen pop stars Ryan Cabrera and Busted. Like debut tours by Tiffany and Britney Spears before her, it stopped at nine malls, starting at Atlanta's Northlake Mall and ending at South Shore Plaza near her hometown of Foxborough. When the single reached number one on the Mainstream Top 40 chart, she became, at age thirteen, the youngest solo artist to have a number-one single in the United States. The first single was nominated for Best New Artist at the 2004 MTV Video Music Awards, which made JoJo the youngest MTV Video Music Award nominee. Her first album, the platinum-selling JoJo, was released in 2004, peaking at number four on the U.S. Billboard 200 and number ten on the Top R&B/Hip-Hop Albums, selling 95,000 copies in its first week and reaching the top forty of the UK Albums Chart. In December 2004, she was nominated for Female New Artist of the Year and Mainstream Top 40 Single of the Year at the Billboard Music Awards. She is also the youngest artist to be nominated at the Billboard Music Awards. Her second single, released in September 2004, the gold-selling "Baby It's You" – which features rapper Bow Wow – peaked at number twenty-two in the U.S. and number eight in the UK. The final single from the album, "Not That Kinda Girl", was released in 2005 and peaked at number eighty-five in Germany.

In 2005, JoJo participated in "Come Together Now", a charity single to benefit the victims of the 2004 Asian tsunami and the 2005 Hurricane Katrina. That year, she was requested by First Lady Laura Bush to perform at the 2004 Christmas in Washington special, broadcast by TNT and hosted by Dr. Phil and his wife Robin McGraw. JoJo hosted and performed at the Hope Rocks Concert in 2005 to benefit City of Hope National Medical Center, and co-hosted the 2006 TV Guide Channel's countdown to the Grammy Awards. In 2005, she was offered a role on the Disney Channel television series Hannah Montana, but she turned down the role in favor of developing her music career.

2006–2009: The High Road, acting and label trouble

In 2006 JoJo was cast opposite Emma Roberts and Sara Paxton in Aquamarine, playing Hailey. The film opened on March 3, 2006, opening at number five with $7.5 million. Her second major film, RV, a comedy starring Robin Williams, was released on April 28, 2006. It opened at number one and grossed $69.7 million. JoJo had to audition for the part five times, and eventually replaced an actress who had already been cast in the role. JoJo's second album, The High Road, was released on October 17, 2006. The album debuted at number three on the Billboard 200, selling 108,000 units. It was produced by Scott Storch, Swizz Beatz, J. R. Rotem, Corey Williams, Soulshock & Karlin and Ryan Leslie. It received mainly positive reviews. In the summer of 2006, the lead single from her second album, "Too Little Too Late", was released to radio stations. "Too Little Too Late" broke the record for the biggest jump into the top three on the Billboard Hot 100 chart, moving from number 66 to number three in one week; this record was previously held by Mariah Carey with her 2001 single "Loverboy", which went from number 60 to number two. The album's second single, "How to Touch a Girl", experienced less success. It charted just outside the Billboard Hot 100 and peaked at number 76 on the Billboard Pop 100. "Anything" was released as the third single to little success. The album sold over 550,000 copies and was certified gold by the RIAA in December 2006.

On July 20, 2007, JoJo's version of "Beautiful Girls" by Sean Kingston leaked on the internet titled "Beautiful Girls Reply". It debuted at number thirty-nine on the Billboard Rhythmic Top 40 chart one month later. In late 2007, JoJo stated that she would be writing songs for her third album, to be released when she turned 18. She said she wanted her fans to "see growth" in her music.

In an April 2008 interview, JoJo stated that she was writing and producing an upcoming album in Boston and Atlanta. On August 30, 2008, JoJo posted her own version of the song "Can't Believe It", originally performed by T-Pain. On June 3, 2009, JoJo stated on her YouTube account that she was waiting for her record label to sign a distribution deal to release her album. In a few months time, nearly 20 of her songs were leaked through a YouTube channel. In August 2009, it was reported that JoJo filed a lawsuit in New York against her record label Da Family Entertainment for putting her in musical limbo. She reportedly sought $500,000 for her troubles and to be released from her contract. JoJo was released from her contract in October 2009 and a deal was reached with Blackground Records to have JoJo's third album distributed by Interscope Records.

In late 2009, JoJo appeared on Timbaland's Shock Value II as a featuring artist on the song "Lose Control". She also appeared as a background vocalist on "Timothy Where You Been" from the same album with the Australian band Jet. On September 10, JoJo revealed that she would be traveling to Toronto to film a small screen adaptation of Lola Douglas' True Confessions of a Hollywood Starlet and play the role of Morgan Carter, with Valerie Bertinelli and Shenae Grimes. It was broadcast on Lifetime Television on August 9, 2008, and released on DVD on March 3, 2009.

2010–2013: Can't Take That Away from Me and Agápē

Can't Take That Away from Me was released as JoJo's first mixtape in September 2010 and spawned the single "In the Dark". In late 2010, JoJo made cameo appearances in music videos for Keri Hilson and Clinton Sparks. In January 2011, JoJo was cast in an episode of CBS's Hawaii Five-0 as Courtney Russell, the daughter of a Tsunami Warning Center scientist who goes missing on the eve of a big storm hitting the Honolulu coast. In February 2011, JoJo uploaded a video to YouTube announcing that she was shooting a video for her song "The Other Chick" and that she had changed the title of the album from All I Want Is Everything to Jumping Trains, stating that she had desires to "represent something different; something fresh". Her actual first lead single "The Other Chick" was supposed to release digitally but the label decided to make it as a buzz single. In June 2011, she released a remix of rapper Drake's song "Marvin's Room", renamed "Marvin's Room (Can't Do Better)" through Rap-Up's YouTube channel. JoJo rewrote the song from a female perspective to express a frustration towards an ex-lover and his supposed new girlfriend. Drake himself expressed his appreciation for her interpretation.

On August 29, 2011, "Disaster" was released to U.S. radio. The song saw her continue in a similar style to her previous hits, which was praised by critics for not "jumping on the synthpop bandwagon", but also criticized for not showing much progression after a five-year hiatus. "Disaster" debuted on the Billboard Hot 100 at number 87, but fell off the chart the next week. This gave JoJo her first charting single since "Too Little Too Late" in 2006. The single failed to impact any chart internationally. In support of the single, she opened for the Joe Jonas & Jay Sean Tour. JoJo gave her first televised performance of the song on Good Day Dallas on September 29, and later performed on a small promotional tour for "Pinktober" in order to raise money for breast cancer research during the month of October. A music video for the song premiered on JoJo's website in November 2011. In August 2011, JoJo signed a promotional deal with HeartSoul clothing to become the new face for their Fall/Winter collection. In December 2011, JoJo signed a deal with skin care brand Clearasil to become the new spokeswoman for Clearasil's PerfectaWash.

In October 2012, JoJo was cast and began working on the film G.B.F. JoJo was cast as Soledad Braunstein who is the President of the Gay Straight Alliance. The film was shot in Los Angeles over 18 days by director Darren Stein. In early 2012, JoJo toured with Big Time Rush for five dates of their Better with U Tour. A promotional single, "Sexy to Me", was made available for purchase on iTunes and Amazon on February 28, 2012. JoJo, wanting to go in a new direction with the album, released "Demonstrate", produced by Noah "40" Shebib, on July 17, 2012. Its release as a single was eventually scrapped for reasons unknown despite a music video already having been filmed.

After Blackground Records lost their distribution deal through Interscope Records in late 2012, resulting once again in the delay of the release of an album, JoJo began recording new material specifically for a new mixtape to be released by the end of the year, as she "didn't want to keep the fans waiting for new music any longer". On November 15, 2012, she announced the release of a mixtape, titled Agápē, which means "unconditional love" in Greek. The project was released for free through digital download on her 22nd birthday on December 20, 2012. In support of the mixtape, JoJo embarked on her first headlining North American tour, The Agápē Tour. "We Get By" was released as the lead single from the mixtape on November 15, 2012. "André" was released as the second single from the mixtape on November 30, 2012, with the music video for the song premiering on March 21, 2013, through Complex magazine.

2014–2018: Label changes, III., Mad Love and re-releasing albums

On July 30, 2013, it was reported that JoJo had filed a lawsuit against her labels Blackground Records and Da Family for "irreparable damages to her professional career". Minors cannot sign contracts that last more than seven years under New York State law and thus she claims that as her contract was signed in 2004, her deal should have expired in 2011. In December 2013 both of JoJo's and Blackground's attorneys agreed to drop the case as both parties came to an agreement outside court. On January 14, 2014, it was announced that JoJo was released from her multi-year battle with the label and signed a new recording contract with Atlantic Records. On February 14, she released an extended play, titled #LoveJo, featuring covers of three classic songs, which were all produced by Da Internz. On March 16, 2014, she performed at SXSW.

On August 5, 2015, JoJo's website under Atlantic was relaunched. On August 20, 2015, JoJo released three singles simultaneously on the III. extended play, which she referred to as a "tringle", as a preview of her third studio album. In support of the release, JoJo embarked on the I Am JoJo Tour, her first world tour, in November 2015. On December 18, 2015, JoJo released the sequel to #LoveJo, titled #LoveJo2.

In June 2016, Fifth Harmony announced that JoJo would be one of the opening acts on their 7/27 Tour. On July 27, 2016, JoJo released the lead single "Fuck Apologies", featuring rapper and label mate Wiz Khalifa. Mad Love, JoJo's third studio album was released on October 14, 2016, ten years following the release of The High Road. The album entered and peaked on the Billboard 200 chart at number 6. In January 2017, JoJo embarked on the Mad Love tour, a four-month concert tour of North America and Europe.

In August 2017, JoJo announced her departure from Atlantic, in conjunction with announcing her new music venture, Clover Music, in a joint deal with Interscope. In April 2018, she announced the Leaks, Covers, & Mixtapes tour, which began on May 29. On December 20, 2018, her 28th birthday, JoJo announced plans to re-release her first album with re-recorded vocals. The following day, JoJo re-released her debut album and The High Road, as well as her singles "Demonstrate", and "Disaster"—all with re-recorded vocals and slightly reworked production. A similar tactic was employed by Taylor Swift years later.

2019–present: Move to Warner and The Masked Singer

As of January 2019, per Billboard, Clover Music is no longer affiliated with Interscope, and will now associate with Warner Records. On February 12, 2019, JoJo announced the release of the single "Say So", which features R&B singer-songwriter PJ Morton, two days later on February 14. "Say So" was included as the lead single on Morton's album Paul. On October 10, 2019, via Instagram, JoJo announced that she would release the single "Joanna" at midnight, followed by the music video premiering the next day. On October 25, JoJo collaborated with Alabama rapper and then-recent Warner Records signee Chika on the single "Sabotage", which was intended the first single from her next album.

JoJo announced a new album via Instagram, Good to Know, which was released on May 1, 2020. A tour supporting the album was set to begin in April 2021. The lead single "Man" was released on March 13, 2020. On August 3, 2020, JoJo announced the single "What U Need" via Instagram. It was released on August 7, 2020, as the lead single from the deluxe version of Good to Know, which followed on August 28, 2020. On October 2, 2020, she released a song titled "The Change", written by Diane Warren, to serve as the official anthem for the Joe Biden 2020 presidential campaign. Her first holiday album, December Baby, was released on October 30 of the same year.

In January 2021, after being twice delayed, JoJo cancelled the Good to Know tour due to the ongoing nature of the COVID-19 pandemic. She also announced that she plans to tour in 2022 after releasing a sixth studio album. Later in 2021, JoJo competed on the fifth season of The Masked Singer as "Black Swan". She finished in second place making her the first female runner-up on the show. On August 17, 2021, she announced her first capsule project (12-track EP) Trying Not to Think About It with the first single "Worst (I Assume)" released three days later. The EP was released on October 1, 2021, followed by a six-date tour starting a day later. It was announced that her original debut album and The High Road would be re-released on September 24, 2021, by the second incarnation of Blackground Records and Empire Distribution, but JoJo encouraged her fans not to listen to it due to the absence of credited songwriting on the original projects. JoJo contributed to Stan Walker's 2022 album All In, collaborating on the song "Remember Us", which she also co-wrote.

Artistry
Musically, JoJo is considered to be primarily a pop and R&B artist; however, the majority of her singles tend to lean more towards the former as a marketing tool. Prefix's Norman Meyers observed that "As an adolescent white girl singing mainstream R&B, her singles have leaned toward pop to snag sales ... But the list of producers on The High Road ... shows that Jojo is more concerned with harder beats and soulful sounds." JoJo is a mezzo-soprano and her singing voice has been widely acclaimed by music critics, one of whom ranked it among "the best in the game", while her R&B recordings have been compared to the likes of R&B singers Brandy and Monica. Describing her as a "vocal phenom", Entertainment Weeklys Leah Greenblatt enthused that JoJo is "capable of Mariah Carey-style upper-register flourishes". Vocally, critics frequently draw comparisons between JoJo and singers Kelly Clarkson and Beyoncé, while Slant Magazine's Sal Cinquemani remarked that the singer "could very well be the next Teena Marie".

At times some of her material and use of melisma has been criticized for being overproduced and overused, respectively. Emma Morgan of Yahoo! Music dismissed JoJo as "mercilessly multi-tracked à la J. Lo, her voice encoded flatteringly as she too-many-notes her way through a succession of R'n'B beats and hooks that owe everything to studio wizardry and little to simple songwriting", lacking experience and soul. While admitting that JoJo is "surprisingly adept at frenzied, sexually possessed hollering", Alex Macpherson of The Guardian believes that the singer "is, however, at her best when compulsively dissecting emotional situations straight out of high-school movies via the medium of big, heartfelt choruses". Pegging JoJo as "a teen-pop star with an R&B singer's voice", Kelefa Sanneh of The New York Times continued, "she can outsing much of the competition, but it also means more ballads ... and more not-quite-credible lovesick lyrics." JoJo's earliest memories of singing are performing songs by Etta James, Ella Fitzgerald, Mariah Carey and Whitney Houston for customers in hair salons. Her mixtape, Agápē, was influenced by musicians Joni Mitchell and James Taylor.

JoJo possesses a mezzo-soprano vocal range, which Jordan Riefe of Maxim described as "better suited to R&B." Upon making her mainstream debut in 2004, critics immediately noticed that JoJo's vocal prowess and material exceeded her age. When she released her single "Demonstrate" in 2012, critics observed that both the singer's voice and lyrics had matured alongside her. Subsequently, JoJo's second mixtape Agápē drew attention from both critics and the singer's own family due to its mature content; Agápē features lyrical references to drinking, drug abuse and sex, which were absent from her previous "G-rated" releases. The mixtape also addresses her conflict with her record label. JoJo's early image followed popular trends related to hip hop culture at the time. The cover of JoJo's first album features the singer donning a T-shirt and cap, which Sal Cinquemani of Slant Magazine dismissed as "contrived and calculated". Matt Collar of AllMusic wrote, "Jojo is an assured and likeable performer who can somehow embody the yin-yang persona of a suburban cheerleader slinging hip-hop attitude." According to Jenny Eliscu of Rolling Stone, the singer "has become a role model to suburban adolescents who talk gangsta but still carpool to school in mom's Kia Sorento."The Guardians Alex Macpherson commented that "In an era of boozy Amys, gobby Lilys and flashing Britneys, a pop star as wholesome as JoJo seems almost quaint." Writing for Prefix, Norman Meyers believes that JoJo "could have been a Mean Girls extra, but she has talent" and "comes off more like a pint-size Mariah Carey or Christina Aguilera than a hip-shaking Britney clone".

Personal life
JoJo lived in Edgewater, New Jersey with her mother, until age 18, when she moved out, living in Boston on her own for a year. As of 2014, she resides in Los Angeles.  JoJo dated American soccer player Freddy Adu from May 2005 until September 2006. The couple met on the MTV show Fake ID Club while JoJo was hosting it. JoJo made an appearance in the commentary box at a New England Revolution home game when they were playing D.C. United. In November 2006, The Washington Post reported that the couple had split up. JoJo revealed on American Top 40 with Ryan Seacrest that she and Adu were still good friends.

In August 2009, JoJo graduated from high school and stated that she would stay focused on future projects. She was accepted to Northeastern University and considered majoring in cultural anthropology but did not attend.

Aside from singing and acting, JoJo is also a supporter of various charitable organizations such as Boys & Girls Clubs of America, World Vision, She's the First, Make A Wish Foundation, and others.

In December 2021, JoJo announced her engagement to Saved by the Bell (2020) actor Dexter Darden.

Discography

Studio albums
 JoJo (2004)
 The High Road (2006)
 Mad Love (2016)
 Good to Know (2020)
 December Baby (2020)

Filmography

Tours

Headlining
 The High Road Tour (2007)
 Then & Now Concert Tour (2010)
 Pinktober (2011)
 The Agápē Tour (2013)
 I Am JoJo Tour (2015–16)
 Mad Love Tour (2017)
 Leaks, Covers and Mixtapes Tour (2018)
 Trying Not to Think About It Tour (2021)
 JoJo Tour 2022 (2022)

As a special guest
 Timbaland – Shock Value II Tour (2010)

As an opening act
 Usher – The Truth World Tour (2004)
 Joe Jonas/Jay Sean – Joe Jonas & Jay Sean Tour (2011)
 Big Time Rush – Better With You Tour (2012)
 Fifth Harmony – The 7/27 Tour (2016)

Awards and nominations

See also
 List of people with reduplicated names
 Clover Music

References

External links

 
 
 
 
 

 
1990 births
Living people
21st-century American actresses
21st-century American singers
21st-century American women singers
American child actresses
American child singers
American women pop singers
American film actresses
American people of French descent
American people of Irish descent
American people of Polish descent
American women singer-songwriters
American sopranos
American television actresses
Child pop musicians
Singers from Vermont
People from Edgewater, New Jersey
People from Foxborough, Massachusetts
People from Brattleboro, Vermont
Universal Music Group artists
Atlantic Records artists
Interscope Records artists
Warner Records artists
Participants in American reality television series
Actresses from New Jersey
Actresses from Vermont
Singer-songwriters from New Jersey
Singer-songwriters from Massachusetts
Association footballers' wives and girlfriends
American contemporary R&B singers